Nelson Sáenz (born 18 November 1965) is a Cuban taekwondo practitioner. He competed in the men's +80 kg event at the 2000 Summer Olympics.

References

External links
 

1965 births
Living people
Cuban male taekwondo practitioners
Olympic taekwondo practitioners of Cuba
Taekwondo practitioners at the 2000 Summer Olympics
Place of birth missing (living people)
Pan American Games gold medalists for Cuba
Pan American Games medalists in taekwondo
Taekwondo practitioners at the 1991 Pan American Games
Taekwondo practitioners at the 1995 Pan American Games
Medalists at the 1991 Pan American Games
Medalists at the 1995 Pan American Games
20th-century Cuban people